Something of, from, or related to Greenland, a country
 List of people from Greenland
Greenlandic Inuit are people identified with the country of Greenland, or of Greenlandic descent: see Demographics of Greenland
 List of Greenlandic Inuit
Greenlandic culture
Greenlandic cuisine
Greenlandic people in Denmark
 Greenlandic language, an Inuit-Yupik-Unangan language spoken by the people of Greenland 
Kalaallisut (West Greenlandic)
Inuktun (North Greenlandic)
Tunumiisut (East Greenlandic)
 Historically, anything relating to the Norse communities in southwestern Greenland
 Greenlandic Norse, extinct language
 Danish language, as spoken in Greenland

Other uses
Greenlandic sheep, a sheep species
Greenlandic krone, a planned currency for Greenland, plans of which were abandoned in 2009
Greenlandic Shark, a national dish of Iceland consisting of a Greenland shark

See also

Greenland (disambiguation)
Greenlandian, a geological stage

Language and nationality disambiguation pages